The following is a list of events effecting Philippine television in 1992. Events listed include television show debuts, finales, cancellations, and channel launches, closures and rebrandings, as well as information about controversies and carriage disputes.

Events
February 17 - ABC returns to air after a year of test broadcasts.
 April 30 – GMA Network Inc. launches the "Rainbow Satellite" branding, becoming the 3rd Philippine television network to go on nationwide satellite broadcast.
 May 30 - Southern Broadcasting Network's DWCP-TV WorldTV Channel 21, the country's first ever modern UHF television station, begins broadcasts. It is the first UHF channel to sign on  following the 1991 shutdown of the television operations of the US military-operated Far East Network.

Premieres
{| class="wikitable"
! Date
! Show
|-
| rowspan="2" |January 6
|GMA Network News on GMA 7
|-
|Heartwatch on Islands TV 13 (now IBC 13)
|-
| January 11
| Mana on ABS-CBN 2
|-
| January 18
| Cooking with the Daza's on ABS-CBN 2
|-
| February 10
| Valiente on ABS-CBN 2
|-
| February 17
| Firing Line on GMA 7
|-
| rowspan="4" | February 21
| Live on 5 on ABC 5
|-
| Big News on ABC 5
|-
| Balitang Balita on ABC 5
|-
| Entertainment Today on ABC 5
|-
| rowspan="3" |February 23
| Bible Guide on ABC 5
|-
| Sine Klasiks on ABC 5
|-
| The Big Night on ABC 5
|-
| February 24
| 48 Hours on ABC 5
|-
| February 25
| ABCinema on ABC 5
|-
| February 26
| Family Rosary Crusade on ABC 5
|-
| rowspan="3" | March 9
| IBC NewsBreak on IBC 13
|-
| IBC News 5:30 Report on IBC 13
|-
| IBC News 11 O'Clock Report on IBC 13
|-
| April 27
| GMA's Best on GMA 7
|-
| May 14
| 5 and Up on ABC 5
|-
|rowspan="3" | May 30
| ABC World News Tonight on World TV 21
|-
| CNN World News on World TV 21
|-
| Lehrer NewsHour on World TV 21
|-
| July 18
| Battle of the Brains on New Vision 9
|-
| August 2
| Showbiz Lingo on ABS-CBN 2
|-
| August 17
| Mara Clara on ABS-CBN 2
|-
| September 6
| Alab on ABS-CBN 2
|-
| September 7
| Hoy Gising! on ABS-CBN 2
|-
| September 14
| Ober Da Bakod on GMA 7
|-
| October 4
| Gwapings Live! on GMA 7
|-
| October 19
| Ang TV on ABS-CBN 2
|-
| December 2
| Home Along Da Riles on ABS-CBN 2
|-
| December 7
| Cedie, Ang Munting Prinsipe on ABS-CBN 2
|-
|}

Unknown
 17 Bernard Club on ABC 5
 Alabang Girls on ABC 5
 Legal Forum on ABC 5
 Adlibs with Cheche Lazaro on ABC 5
 Boyoyong on ABC 5
 Caloy's Angels on ABC 5
 Handog ni Brocka on ABC 5
 Idol si Pidol on ABC 5
 K-TV on ABC 5
 Late Night with Edu on ABC 5
 Learning your ABC on ABC 5
 Mga Yagit sa Lansangan on ABC 5
 Mr. DJ on ABC 5
 P.O.P.S.: Pops On Primetime Saturday on ABC 5
 Showtime Funtime on ABC 5
 Starzan on ABC 5
 Stay Awake on ABC 5
 Straight To The Heart on ABC 5
 Studio 5 Presents on ABC 5
 Sunday Mass on ABC on ABC 5
 The Chaplet of the Divine Mercy on ABC 5
 The Edu Manzano Show on ABC 5
 TVJ on 5 on ABC 5
 Viva Telekomiks on ABC 5 
 Public Forum on ABC 5
 The Big Story on ABC 5
 Tiny Toons Adventures on ABC 5
 Philippine Headline News on World TV 21
 World TV Mag on World TV 21
 Japayuki on ABS-CBN 2
 Mga Lihim ng Ermita on ABS-CBN 2
 Mr. Cupido on ABS-CBN 2
 Nora on ABS-CBN 2
 Gym Team on ABS-CBN 2
 International News Report on IBC 13
 OPS-PIA: Ugnayan sa Hotel Rembrandt on IBC 13
 Pasikatan sa 13 on IBC 13
 The Message on IBC 13
 P.Y. (Praise Youth) on IBC 13
 Silver Germs on GMA 7
 Teen Talk on GMA 7
 Agrisiete on GMA 7
 Billy Bilyonaryo on GMA 7
 Viva Sinerama on GMA 7
 Music Video Features on GMA 7
 De Buena Familia on New Vision 9
 Heart to Heart Talk on New Vision 9
 FVR Up Close on New Vision 9/PTV 4/IBC 13
 Just the 3 of Us on New Vision 9
 OPS-PIA: Ugnayan sa Hotel Rembrandt on New Vision 9/IBC 13
 The Police Hour on New Vision 9
 The Whimpols on New Vision 9
 Veggie, Meaty & Me on New Vision 9
 Job Network on PTV 4
 Kalikasan, Kaunlaran by Earth Institute Asia on PTV 4
 El Shaddai on IBC 13
 Shaider on IBC 13
 Candy Candy on IBC 13
 The Flying House on GMA 7
 Dragon Ball on New Vision 9
 Dog of Flanders: My Patrasche on ABS-CBN 2

Programs transferring networks

Finales
 January 3:
 GMA Headline News on GMA 7
 Isabel, Sugo ng Birhen on ABS-CBN 2
 February 7: Agila on ABS-CBN 2
 March 6:
 Island Newsbreak on Island TV 13
 Headline Trese on Islands TV 13
 The 11 O'Clock News on Islands TV 13
 July 11: Uncle Bob's Lucky 7 Club on GMA 7
 July 26: Junior Patrol on ABS-CBN 2
 August 14: Sebya, Mahal Kita on ABS-CBN 2

Unknown
 Maricel Regal Drama Special on ABS-CBN 2
 Luv Ko si Kris on ABS-CBN 2
 Cooking It Up with Nora on ABS-CBN 2
 Star Smile Factory on ABS-CBN 2
 Cathedral of Praise with David Sumrall on ABS-CBN 2
 Classified Ads On Television on ABS-CBN 2
 Video Hit Parade on ABS-CBN 2
 Hotline sa Trese on IBC 13
 Usap-Usapan Live on IBC 13
 Magic Kamison on IBC 13
 TVJ: Television's Jesters on IBC 13
 Awitawanan on IBC 13
 Islands Gamemasters on IBC 13
 Eerie, Indiana on GMA 7
 Face to Face on GMA 7
 GMA Gems on GMA 7
 Silver Germs on GMA 7
 Murder, She Wrote on GMA 7
 Adlibs with Cheche Lazaro on ABC 5
 Caloy's Angels on ABC 5
 Handog ni Brocka on ABC 5
 Learning your ABC on ABC 5
 Mga Yagit sa Lansangan on ABC 5
 Mr. DJ on ABC 5
 Noli Me Tangere on ABC 5
 Showtime Funtime on ABC 5
 Starzan on ABC 5
 Stay Awake on ABC 5
 TVJ on 5 on ABC 5
 Viva Telekomiks on ABC 5
 Cebu I, Cebu II on New Vision 9
 Manilyn Live! on IBC 13
 Bhoy on PTV 4
 Estudyante Blues on PTV 4
 Midnight Session on PTV 4
 Pangungusap ng Pangulo on PTV 4
 Pin Pin on PTV 4
 Sine Aksyon sa Kuatro on PTV 4
 Sine Huwebes sa Kuatro on PTV 4
 Viva Drama Specials on PTV 4
 Candy Candy on IBC 13
 Cedie, Ang Munting Prinsipe on ABS-CBN 2
 The Flying House on GMA 7

Channels
Launches
 February 21: ABC 5 (now TV5)
 May 17: EEC 23 (now defunct)
 May 30: World TV 21 (now ETC)
 October 1: CCTV-4Unknown
 Intervision 68''

Births
January 2 – Alden Richards, actor
January 8 – Pamu Pamorada, actress
January 23 – Inah De Belen, actress
January 28 - Penelope Matanguihan, singer and actress
March 30 – Enrique Gil, actor and dancer
April 6 – Elora Españo, actress
April 10 – Marion Aunor, singer and recording artist
April 19 – Bianca Casado, actress
April 25 – Aura Azarcon
April 30 – Eslove Briones, actor
May 8 – Vickie Rushton
May 9 – Jiro Manio, actor
May 10 –
 Jake Zyrus, singer and television personality
 Zia Marquez, actress
June 30 – Alfred Labatos, actor
July 1 – Kenneth Paul Cruz, actor
July 9 – Jake Vargas, actor and singer
August 1 – Victor Silayan, actor
August 28 – Max Collins, TV and film actress
September 1 – Louise delos Reyes, actress
September 9 – Frencheska Farr, singer, model and actress
September 24 – Coleen Garcia, actress
October 17 – Sam Concepcion, singer, dancer, actor, host and model
November 20 - John Victor Susim, actor, dancer and host
November 22 – Yen Santos, actress
December 3 – Jessy Mendiola, actress
December 6 – Christian Bables, actor
December 16 – Miho Nishida, Filipino-Japanese actress and model

Deaths
February 3- Jay Ilagan
February 9 - Apeng Daldal
February 14 - Helen Vela
March 22 - Joe Cantada

See also
1992 in television

 
Television in the Philippines by year
Philippine television-related lists